Campbell Army Airfield  is a military airport at Fort Campbell, which is located near Hopkinsville, a city in Christian County, Kentucky, United States.

Previously Campbell Air Force Base, a U.S. Air Force installation from 1947 to 1959, this U.S. Army airfield has two asphalt paved runways: 5/23 is 11,826 by 200 feet (3,605 × 61 m) and 18/36 is 4,500 by 150 feet (1,372 × 46 m).

The airfield currently houses UH-60M, CH-47F, and AH-64D helicopters belonging to the 101st Combat Aviation Brigade, and MH-60M, MH-60M DAP, MH-47G, and MH-6/AH-6M helicopters of 1st Battalion, 2d Battalion, and Special Operations Aviation Training Battalion of the 160th Special Operations Aviation Regiment (Airborne). It was also home to elements of the 159th Combat Aviation Brigade, before the brigade was deactivated in 2015.

Current Units
 101st Airborne Division
Combat Aviation Brigade, 101st Airborne Division (CAB) ("Wings of Destiny")(♦)
  Brigade Headquarters and Headquarters Company ("Hell Cats")
  2nd Squadron, 17th Cavalry Regiment ("Out Front")
  1st Battalion, 101st Aviation Regiment ("Expect No Mercy")
  5th Battalion, 101st Aviation Regiment ("Eagle Assault")
  6th Battalion, 101st Aviation Regiment (General Support) ("Shadow of the Eagle")
  96th Aviation Support Battalion ("Troubleshooters")
  160th Special Operations Aviation Regiment (Airborne)
  Regimental Headquarters and Headquarters Company
  USASOAC Special Operations Training Battalion (co-lead by the 160th SOAR(A))
  1st Battalion, 160th SOAR(A)
  2nd Battalion, 160th SOAR(A)

See also
 Sabre Army Heliport
 Kentucky World War II Army Airfields

References

External links
 Campbell Army Airfield at GlobalSecurity.org
 
 

Airports in Kentucky
Buildings and structures in Christian County, Kentucky
United States Army airfields
Airfields of the United States Army Air Forces in Kentucky